Vengapuram or is a village located in Balijipeta mandalam in Parvathipuram Manyam district in Andhra Pradesh State in India.

Geography
Vengapuram is near the town of Bobbili, a historical town famous for the Battle of Bobbili.

Demographics
According to Indian census, 2001, the demographic details of this village is as follows:
 Total Population: 	2,423 in 552 Households.
 Male Population: 	1,196
 Female Population: 	1,227
 Children Under 6-years of age: 310 (Boys - 159 and Girls - 151)
 Total Literates: 	1,086

References

External links
 Vengapuram, Tumarada and Balijipeta villages in Wikimapia.org

Villages in Parvathipuram Manyam district